Gloria W. Marks (born 1923) is a former pitcher who played in the All-American Girls Professional Baseball League during the  season.

Gloria Marks was one of the sixty original players recruited by the All-American Girls Professional Baseball League for its inaugural season. 

Born in San Diego, California, she pitched for several championship teams in her native San Diego before joining the league.

Marks was assigned to the Racine Belles, a team managed by former big leaguer Johnny Gottselig, as part of a pitching staff headed by Mary Nesbitt and Joanne Winter.

In her only season in the league, Marks helped win Racine the regular season title and the championship after going 11–9 for a .550 winning percentage. She also helped herself with the bat, connecting seven of her 18 hits for extra bases, to collect a very solid .471 slugging average.

Since 1988 she is part of Women in Baseball, a permanent display based at the Baseball Hall of Fame and Museum in Cooperstown, New York, which was unveiled to honor the entire All-American Girls Professional Baseball League.

Career statistics
Pitching

Batting

Fielding

Sources

Further reading
 
 

All-American Girls Professional Baseball League players
Baseball players from San Diego
1923 births
Possibly living people
Date of birth missing (living people)